The Nilgiri Himal is a range of three peaks in the Annapurna massif in Nepal. It is composed of Nilgiri North (7061 m), Nilgiri Central (6940 m) and Nilgiri South (6839 m).

Nilgiri North was first ascended in October 1962 by The Netherlands Himalayan Expedition; the team leader was a famous French climber, Lionel Terray.
The first ascents on Nilgiri South and Nilgiri Central were made by Japanese climbers in 1978 and 1979 respectively.

External links 
 Nilgiri on summitpost.org
 Nilgiri South at night
 Nilgiri South daytime

References

Mountains of the Gandaki Province
Seven-thousanders of the Himalayas
Mustang District
Mountain ranges of Nepal